Cephetola catuna is a butterfly in the family Lycaenidae. It is found in Cameroon, the Republic of the Congo, the Central African Republic, Gabon, the Democratic Republic of the Congo and Uganda.
Adults females oviposit on lichens on the bark of twigs and tree trunks. The larvae are attended by ants.

Subspecies
Cephetola catuna catuna (Cameroon, Congo, Central African Republic, Gabon, Democratic Republic of the Congo, Uganda)
Cephetola catuna carpenteri (Bethune-Baker, 1922) (Uganda)

References

External links
Die Gross-Schmetterlinge der Erde 13: Die Afrikanischen Tagfalter. Plate XIII 65 a as Epitola mus

Butterflies described in 1890
Poritiinae
Butterflies of Africa